Heart 103.5 may refer to:

 Heart Sussex, in Brighton and Worthing
 DWKX, as branded in 2007